Samuel John Sitta (18 December 1942 – 7 November 2016) was a Tanzanian CCM politician and Member of Parliament for Urambo East of Tabora Region . He was the Speaker of the National Assembly of Tanzania from December 2005 to 2010 and Minister of East African Cooperation from 2010 to 2015.

Life and career
Sitta, a member of the majority Chama Cha Mapinduzi party, served as a member of parliament from 1975 to 1995 and was director-general of the Tanzania Investment Centre. Later he served again as an MP, representing Urambo Mashariki.

He was elected to succeed Pius Msekwa as Speaker of the National Assembly on 26 December 2005.  He was appointed to the Cabinet as Minister of East African Cooperation in 2010.

Samuel Sitta died at around 3am on 7 November 2016 at TUM School of Medicine (Klinikum rechts der Isar) in Munich (Germany) after falling ill for a short period.

References

1942 births
2016 deaths
Chama Cha Mapinduzi MPs
Tanzanian MPs 2010–2015
Speakers of the National Assembly (Tanzania)
Government ministers of Tanzania
Tabora Boys Secondary School alumni
University of Dar es Salaam alumni
People from Tabora Region
Tanzanian Roman Catholics